Rhind Lectures are a series of lectures on archaeological topics. They have been hosted by the Society of Antiquaries of Scotland since 1874. The content of the lectures is usually published in journals or expanded into new works by their authors.

The name commemorates Alexander Henry Rhind, whose bequest to the society funded this lectureship. Rhind directed that his estate be used for this purpose, once the interests of living parties were extinguished, which took place 11 years after his death in 1863. The speaker and subject are selected some three years in advance, allowing the speaker to give a detailed exposition of a topic in their area of expertise.

The Rhind Lectures have continued into the 21st century, and since 2009 the society has published a video file that is freely available to the public.

Lecturers 1874–2008 
The total number of lectures in the series in 2012 was 133. The following is a list of all lecturers to 2012, with the title of their lectures where known.

1	1874/76	The past in the Present
		Arthur Mitchell, MD, LLD
		
2	1876/78	The past in the Present
		Arthur Mitchell, MD., LLD
		
3	1879	Scotland in Early Christian Times
		Joseph Anderson
		
4	1880	Scotland in Early Christian Times 
		Joseph Anderson
		
5	1881	Scotland in Pagan Times: The Iron Age
		Joseph Anderson
		
6	1882	Scotland in Pagan Times: The Bronze and Stone Ages
		Joseph Anderson
		
7	1883	The Roman Occupation of Britain
		Rev J Collingwood Bruce, LLD FSA
		
8	1884	Ogham inscriptions in Ireland and Scotland
		Sir Samuel Ferguson, QC., LLD., President of the Royal Irish Academy
		
9	1885	Early Christian symbolism in Great Britain and Ireland
		J Romilly Allen, CE
		
10	1886	Register of Privy Council of Scotland
		David Masson, MA LLD., Professor of Rhetoric & English Literature, University of Edinburgh
		
11	1887	Greek Antiquities
		Alexander Stuart Murray, LLD., Keeper of Greek and Roman Antiquities, British Museum, London
		
12	1888	The Lake Dwellings of Europe
		Robert Munro, MA MD., Author of Ancient Scottish Lake Dwellings
		
13	1889	Early Ethnology of the British Isles
		John Rhys, MA, Professor of Celtic at Oxford
		
14	1890	Archaeological Aspects of Scottish Zoology
		Professor J Duns, DD., New College, Edinburgh
		
15	1891	The Anthropological History of Europe
		John Beddoe, MD LLD FRS, Vice-President of the Anthropological Institute of Great Britain and Ireland
		
16	1892	The Early Christian Monuments of Scotland
		Joseph Anderson, LLD., Assistant Secretary and Keeper of the Scottish National Museum of Antiquities, Edinburgh
		
17	1893	The Place-names of Scotland
		Sir Herbert Maxwell, 7th Baronet
		
18	1894	Early fortifications in Scotland
		David Christison, MD
		
19	1895	The Origins of Celtic Art
		Arthur Evans, MA., Keeper of the Ashmolean Museum, Oxford
		
20	1896	Industrial arts of Scandinavia in pagan times
		Dr Hans Hildebrand, Royal Antiquary of Sweden
		
21	1897	The Evidence for a Roman Occupation of North Britain
		James MacDonald, LLD
		
22	1898	Heraldry
		James Balfour Paul, Lyon King-of-Arms
		
23	1899	Architecture in Scotland
		Thomas Ross
		
24	1900	The Edwards in Scotland, 1296–1377
		Joseph Bain, FSA Scot
		
25	1901	The Constitution, Organisation, and Law of the Mediaeval Church in Scotland
		Bishop Dowden
		
26	1902	Castellated architecture of Scotland 
		Thomas Ross
		
27	1903	Scotland in the Time of Queen Mary
		P Hume Brown, MA LLD., Fraser Professor of Ancient (Scottish) History and Palaeography in the University of Edinburgh
		
28	1904	Roman Scotland
		George Macdonald, MA
		
29	1905	Roman Britain 
		Dr F Haverfield, MA LLD
		
30	1906	The Archaeology of the Cuneiform Inscriptions
		Professor Archibald Sayce
		
31	1907	Roman Britain
		Dr F Haverfield, MA LLD
		
32	1908	The Roman Station at Newstead
		Mr James Curle
		
33	1909	The Occupation and use of the land in Scotland in Early Times
		Dr David Murray
		
34	1910	Art of the Period of the Teutonic Migrations
		Professor Gerard Baldwin Brown
		
35	1911	The Records of Scotland
		J Maitland Thomson, LLD
		
36	1912	The Early Chronicles relating to Scotland
		Rt Hon Sir Herbert Maxwell, Bart., President of the Society
		
37	1913	Some aspects of Scottish Feudalism
		Dr George Neilson
		
38	1913	The Development of writing and printing in Western Europe
		Dr W K Dickson
		
39	1914	The Liturgy and Ceremonial of The Mediaeval Church in Scotland
		Mr F C Eeles
		
40	1915	Medals of the Renaissance
		Mr George Francis Hill, Keeper of Coins & Medals, British Museum
		
41	1916	Celtic Place-Names in Scotland
		Professor W J Watson, LLD
		
42	1917	Arms and Armour
		Mr Charles J. ffoulkes, Curator of the Royal Armouries, Tower of London
		
43	1918	The Prehistoric Monuments of Scotland
		Mr A O Curle
		
44	1919	House Furnishing and Domestic Life in Scotland 1488–1688
		Mr John Warrack
		
45	1920	Painting in the Roman Empire (from the last century of the Republic to about 800 AD)
		Mrs Arthur (Eugénie) Strong, British School at Rome
		
46	1921	Egyptian Science
		Professor W M Flinders Petrie
		
47	1922	Monastic Building in Britain
		Mr C R Peers
		
48	1923	The Civilisation of Greece in the Bronze Age
		Dr H R Hall
		
49	1924	Early Races of Scotland
		Professor Thomas H Bryce
		
50	1925	The Mediaeval Castle in Scotland
		Mr W M Mackenzie, Secretary RCAHMS
		
51	1926	Italian Sculpture of the Renaissance
		Mr Eric Maclagan, director, V & A Museum
		
52	1927	Roman Britain
		Sir George Macdonald, KCB FBA LLD
		
53	1928	The Ancient Connections between Scotland and Norway
		Professor A W Brøgger
		
54	1929	The History of the Brooch
		Mr Reginald A Smith, BA FSA
		
55	1930	The Hittites
		Professor Garstang
		
56	1931	Monastic Life and its influence on the Civilisation of Scotland
		Mr George Gordon Coulton, Litt D DLitt LLD FBA
		
57	1932	The Megalithic Culture of Northern Europe
		Dr C A Nordman, Helsingfors
		
58	1933	English Illumination from AD 700 to the end of the Fifteenth Century
		Mr Eric G Millar, DLitt
		
59	1934	Augustan Civilisation in Western Europe
		Mr Ian A Richmond
		
60	1935	Early Anglo Saxon Art and Archaeology
		Mr E T Leeds, Keeper of the Ashmolean Museum
		
61	1936	The Archaeology of the Iberian Peninsula
		Professor P Bosch Gimpera
		
62	1937	Mediaeval Edinburgh
		Dr C A Malcolm
		
63	1938	Excavations at Ras Shamra
		Monsieur Claude Shaeffer
		
64	1939	Early Art of Scandinavia
		Professor Haakon Shetelig
		
		1940 Postponed (delivered in April 1942)
		
65	1941	The Province of Mar
		Dr W Douglas Simpson
		
66	1942	Jurisdictions of Mediaeval Scotland
		Dr W C Dickinson
		
67	1943	The Topography of Roman Scotland
		Mr O G S Crawford, FSA
		
68	1944	The Development of Tribal Society in Scotland
		Professor V G Childe, DLitt DSc FBA V-PSA
		
69	1945	The Scottish Burghs
		Dr W Mackay Mackenzie
		
70	1946 Spring	Scandinavian Art of the Post-Christian Pagan Period
		Professor Haakon Shetelig 
		
71	1946 Oct	Castles and Cannon: A Study of Early Artillery Fortifications in England
		Mr Bryan H St John O’Neil
		
		1947 No lecture
		
72	1948	Early Christian Monuments in the Near East
		Professor W M Calder, LLD
		
73	1949	First: The Mediaeval Stone Carver in Scotland
	(Two series of lectures delivered)	Mr James S Richardson, LLD
		
74		Second: Regional House-Styles: their origins and development: recent studies in South Wales
		Sir Cyril Fox, DLitt FSA
		
75	1950 (Series of seven lectures)	Periods of Highland Civilization
		Miss I F Grant LLD
		
76	1951	Discipline of Field Archaeology
		Professor R E Mortimer Wheeler
		
77	1952	Greek Sculpture: The Century after Pheidias
		Mr Bernard Ashmole, MC MA BLitt FBA
		
78	1953	Architecture in Elizabethan England
		Mr John Summerson, CBE FSA ARIBA
		
79	1954	The Laboratory in the service of Art and Archaeology
		Dr H J Plenderleith
		
80	1955	A Survey of American Archaeology
		Dr G H S Bushnell
		
81	1956	Classical inspiration in Medieval Art
		Mr W F Oakenshott
		
		1957 No lecture due to the death of Professor S P O’Riordain
		
82	1958	The Historical Local Institutions of Scotland
		Professor G S Pryde of Glasgow
		
83	1959	The Role of Constantinople in Byzantine Art
		Professor D Talbot Rice
		
84	1960	Roman Imperial Art
		Mr J B Ward Perkins, Director of The British School at Rome
		
85	1961	The Origins of the Late Celtic Art
		Professor Haseloff of Würzburg
		
86	1962  March	Mounds of the Middle East: their formation and excavation
		Mr Seton Lloyd, CBE
		
87	Nov	The Prehistoric Origins of Europe
		Professor Stuart Piggott, BLitt DLitt HUM
		
88	1964	The Coins of the Ancient Celts
		Mr D F Allen, BA FBA FSA
		
89	1965  March	Anglo-Saxon Pottery and the Settlement of England
		Mr J N L Myres, MA LLD FSA
		
90	Oct	Cultural Structure and Movement in East Asia from the Neolithic Period to the Unification of China
		Mr William Watson, MA
		
91	1966/67	Scottish Architects and English Architecture in the 18th Century
		Dr PJ Murray
		
92	1967/68	Late Medieval Monumental Sculpture in the West Highlands
		Dr K A Steer 
		
93	1968/69	The Roman Frontier in Germany in the Light of New Research
		Prof Dr Hans Schonberger 
		
94	1969/70	The Furnishing of Medieval Churches in Scotland
		The Rt Rev Monsigneur D McRoberts S.T.L. 
		
95	1970/71	Plough and Field shape from Prehistoric Times to c1500 AD
		Prof Axel Steensberg
		
96	1972/73	Byzantine Mosaic and Wall Paintings
		D Winfield 
		
97	1973/74	Aspects of Archaeology in Iran
		D B Stronach 
		
98	1974/75	Scottish Silversmiths and Their Work
		Stuart Maxwell
		
99	1975/76	Interior Decoration in Great Britain
		G Beard
		
100	1976/77	Pictish Art and Society
		Dr I Henderson
		
101	1977/78	Pre-Roman Celtic Art 
		Prof O-H Frey
		
102	1978/79	The Medieval Cathedrals of Scotland 
		Dr R Cant
		
103	1979/80	The Course of Architecture in Ireland
		Dr M Craig
		
104	1980/81	The Industrial Heritage
		Prof S G E Lythe
		
105	1981/82	Pre-Roman and Native Settlement between the Tyne and Forth
		Prof G Jobey
		
106	1982/83	Aspects of the Neolithic and Early Bronze Age in the Netherlands and Britain
		Prof JD van der Waals
		
107	1983/84	The Danube Frontier of the Roman Empire
		Prof J J Wilkes
		
	1985/86	
108	1986/87	Culture, Tradition and Artifact
		Dr A Gailey
		
109	1987/88	The Archaeology of Death in Ancient Egypt
		Dr A Rosalie Davie
		
110	1988/89	An Heroic Age: War and Society in Northern Britain AD 450–850
		Prof Leslie Alcock
		
111	1989/90	The Archaeology of the Slavs
		Dr Martin Gojda
		
112	1990/91	The Revival of Medieval and Early Renaissance Architecture in Scotland 1745–1930
		Dr D M Walker
		
113	1991/92	Altering The Earth: The Origins of Monuments in Britain and Continental Europe
		Prof R Bradley
		
114	1992/93	Scottish Monastic life on the Eve of the Reformation
		Dr Mark Dilworth
		
115	1993/94	Oral Narrative in Scotland
		Donald A MacDonald
		
116	1994/95	Enlarging the Past: the contribution of Wetland Archaeology
		Professor John and Dr Bryony Coles
		
117	1995/96	Death and Wealth in Viking Scotland
		Professor James Graham-Campbell
		
118	1996/97	The Food of the Scots		Professor Alexander Fenton
		
119	1997/98	Scottish Royal Palaces: The Architecture of the Royal Residences during the Late Medieval and Early Renaissance Periods
		John Dunbar
		
120	1998/99	The Origins of Insular Monasticism 
		Professor Charles Thomas
		
121	1999–2000	Significant Figures: Anderson, Baldwin-Brown, Childe, AO Curle, J Curle, A McBain, L Mann, WF Skene
		Dr D J Breeze; Dr DV Clarke; Professor D Meek; Dr JNG Ritchie; Mr WDH Sellar
		
122	2000–2001	Art as Archaeology, Archaeology as Art: Transformations through material culture
		Professor Colin Renfrew, Baron Renfrew of Kaimsthorn, University of Cambridge
		
123	2001–2002	Peoples Between The Oceans
		 Professor Barry Cunliffe, University of Oxford
		
124	2002–2003	Lines from the past: towards an anthropological archaeology of inscription
		Professor Tim Ingold, University of Aberdeen
		
125	2003–2004	Court, Capital and Country: the Emergence of Renaissance Scotland
		Professor Michael Lynch, University of Edinburgh
		
126	2004–2005	Men who turned towards the light: Cult and creativity in the Romans’ world
		Professor Greg Woolf, University of St Andrews
		
127	2006	Rock and Cave Art
		Paul Bahn
		
128	2007	Living in an Age of Stone: Neolithic people and their worlds
		Professor Gabriel Cooney, University College Dublin
		
129	2008	Archaeology and the Sea in Scandinavia and Britain
		Professor , Denmark

Lecturers 2009- 
		
130	2009	New Light on the Dawn: a new perspective on the Neolithic Revolution in Southwest Asia		Emeritus Professor Trevor Watkins, University of Edinburgh
		
131	2010	Design versus Dogma: Reflections on Field Archaeology
		Professor Martin Carver, University of York
		
132	2011	Material and spiritual engagements; Britain and Ireland in the first age of metal
		Dr Stuart Needham
		
133	2012	On the windy edge of nothing: Vikings in the North Atlantic world – ecological and social journeys
		Professor Kevin Edwards, University of Aberdeen

134	2013	‘magnificent for the beauty and extent of its buildings and worthy of everlasting fame’ – the architecture of the Scottish late medieval Church
		Professor Richard Fawcett, University of St Andrews

135	2014	Archaeology and Celtic Myth – an exploration
		Professor John Waddell, NUI Galway

136	2015	British Archaeology: its progress and demands
		Various contributors including, Professor Audrey Horning, Queen’s University Belfast; Professor Ian Baxter, University Campus Suffolk; Dr Jacqui Mulville, Cardiff University; Margaret Maitland, National Museums Scotland; Dr Rebecca Jones, Historic Environment Scotland; Dr Alan Leslie, Northlight Heritage; Professor Mary Bownes, University of Edinburgh; Professor Keith Dobney, University of Aberdeen; Dr Greger Larson, University of Oxford; Dr Eva-Maria Geigl, CNRS University Paris 7; Professor Ian Barnes, Natural History Museum; and Professor Richard Bradley

137	2016	Antiquaries, archaeologists and the invention of the historic town c.1700–1860		Professor Roey Sweet, University of Leicester, Centre for Urban History

138	2017	Sacred Heritage: medieval monasticism, magic and memory
		Professor Roberta Gilchrist, University of Reading
		
139	2018	Drystone technologies: Neolithic tensions and Iron Age compressions
		Dr John Barber, AOC Archaeology Group

References

External links
Rhind Lectures recorded online since 2009

Archaeological organizations
Archaeology of Scotland
British lecture series